James Arthur Davies (8 January 1906 – 11 July 1999) was a Canadian cyclist. He competed in the team pursuit and sprint events at the 1928 Summer Olympics.

References

External links
 

1906 births
1999 deaths
Canadian male cyclists
Olympic cyclists of Canada
Cyclists at the 1928 Summer Olympics
People from Wandsworth
Cyclists from Greater London